Cetkovský (feminine Cetkovská) is a Czech surname. Notable people include:

 Alois Cetkovský (1908–1987), Czech ice hockey player
 Jiří Cetkovský (born 1983), Czech ice hockey player
 Petra Cetkovská (born 1985), Czech tennis player

Czech-language surnames